The Sanxing are the gods of the three stars or constellations considered essential in Chinese astrology and mythology: Jupiter, Ursa Major, and Canopus. Fu, Lu, and Shou, or Cai, Zi and Shou are also the embodiments of Fortune (Fu), presiding over the planet Jupiter, Prosperity (Lu), presiding over Mizar, and Longevity (Shou), presiding over Canopus. They have emerged from Chinese folk religion. Their iconic representation as three, old, bearded, wise men dates back to the Ming dynasty, when the gods of the three stars were represented in human form for the first time. They are sometimes identified with other deities of the Chinese religion or of Taoism.

The term is commonly used in Chinese culture to denote the three attributes of a good life. Statues of these three gods are found on the facades of folk religion's temples and ancestral shrines, in nearly every Chinese home and many Chinese-owned shops on small altars with a glass of water, an orange or other auspicious offerings, especially during Chinese New Year. Traditionally, they are arranged right to left (so Shou is on the left of the viewer, Lu in the middle, and Fu on the far right), just as Chinese characters are traditionally written from right to left.

The three gods, their stars and their attributes

Fuxing

The star of Fu, Fuxing , refers to the planet Jupiter. In traditional astrology, the planet Jupiter was believed to be auspicious. Alternatively, according to a Taoist myth of the Ming dynasty, the Fu star is associated with Yang Cheng, a governor of Daozhou in Tang Dynasty. Yang Cheng risked his life by writing a memorial to the emperor to save the people from presenting dwarf slaves as the special tribute to the imperial court. After his death, the people built a temple to commemorate him, and over time he came to be considered the personification of good fortune.

He is generally depicted in scholar's dress, holding a scroll, on which is sometimes written the character "Fu". He may also be seen holding a child, or surrounded by children. He is sometimes conflated with Caishen, the "Wealth God".

Luxing
The star of Lu, Luxing , is Mizar (ζ Ursa Majoris), or, in traditional Chinese astronomy, the sixth star in the Wenchang cluster, and like the Fu star came to be personified. The Lu star is believed to be Zhang Xian who lived during the Later Shu dynasty. The word lu specifically refers to the salary of a government official. As such, the Lu star is the star of prosperity, rank, and influence.

The Lu star was also worshipped separately from the other two as the deity dictating one's success in the imperial examinations, and therefore success in the imperial bureaucracy. The Lu star is usually depicted in the dress of a mandarin.

Shouxing

The star of Shou, Shouxing , is α Carinae (Canopus), the star of the south pole in Chinese astronomy, and is believed to control the life spans of mortals. According to legend, he was carried in his mother's womb for ten years before being born, and was already an old man when delivered. He is recognized by his high, domed forehead and the peach which he carries as a symbol of immortality. The longevity god is usually shown smiling and friendly, and he may sometimes be carrying a gourd filled with the elixir of life. He is sometimes conflated with Master Lao and corresponding gods of Taoist theology.

Gallery

See also
 He-He Er Xian, Immortals of Harmony and Union, associated with happy marriages
 Tai Sui 60 Heavenly Officials who will be in charge of each year during the Chinese sixty years cycle
 Fukurokuju, Japanese god derived from "Shou" deity of Sanxing
 Seven Lucky Gods, similar group of Japanese auspicious deities
 Wufang Shangdi
 Color in Chinese culture
 Astra Planeta

References

 Seow, Jeffrey. Fu Lu Shou: Gods of Blessings, Prosperity and Longevity, Singapore, 1999.

Chinese gods
Fortune gods
Holiday characters
Stellar gods